Thomas Vincent (born 1969) is an Australian jazz pianist, composer, arranger and band leader.

Early years

In 1988–1989, Vincent received his Associate Diploma of Jazz Studies under the direction of Don Burrows at the Sydney Conservatorium of Music with lecturers George Golla, Mike Nock and Roger Frampton.

He performed regularly on the Sydney jazz scene for five years before moving to New York (1992) to live and perform for three years, studying at the BMI Jazz Composers Workshop with Manny Albam, Roger Kellaway and Jim McNeely.

Teaching, performing, and recording
Returning to Australia in 1995 to start a family, Vincent was Jazz Piano Lecturer at the Tasmanian Conservatorium and then Lecturer in Contemporary Keyboard Techniques at the Northern Rivers Conservatorium in New South Wales. At this time, Elliott Dalgleish (saxophone) and Scott Tinkler (trumpet) first collaborated with Vincent.

In 1998, Marc Meader (drums) returned to Australia to perform and record with Vincent. This ten-year reunion established the Vincent/Meader Trio.

1999 saw the release of Vincent's first CD as a leader, Vincent/Meader Trio. In this year Tom completed his Bachelor of Music (hons) at the VCA in Melbourne, was active on the Australian jazz scene, invited to be part of the Wangaratta National Jazz Piano Awards, and toured Queensland with John Rodgers' Aboriginal Musical for the Queensland Theatre Company.

In 2000, the Vincent/Meader Trio conducted a major tour of Australia and recorded their second CD, Second Impression.

Vincent lived in Amsterdam in 2001 where he performed regularly with his Trio which also toured Europe.

Now based in Hobart, Vincent performs and records overseas and in Australia at festivals and jazz clubs. He is one of Australia's leading jazz pianists, invited by ABC Classic FM to perform for their Live Broadcast series with his various groups (Trio, Quartet, Septet) and known for his composing/arranging work for the ABC TV

In 2006 the Tom Vincent Trio toured Tasmania for six weeks. The CD Blood Red by the Tom Vincent Trio was commissioned by ABC Classic FM's Jazz Tracks and is the first jazz recording for the program to take place in Tasmania.

In 2010, Vincent's Trio toured Australia supporting Branford Marsalis. Also in 2010, Vincent conducted a major world tour, performing twenty-one gigs in ten countries.

In 2011, Vincent toured Australia twice with his Trios: Tom Vincent Trio and Tom Vincent Morphic Resonance Project . His fourth CD was also released, Jazz Lives.

In 2012 Tom Vincent put together his first Septet. In 2013 the Tom Vincent Quartet recorded the CD Just Enough and toured Australia.

In 2014 the Tom Vincent Septet performed in Melbourne and recorded the self-titled album Tom Vincent Septet.

In 2015 the Tom Vincent Trio went to US and recorded Tom's 8th CD called Blues in America with Branford Marsalis.

In 2016 the Tom Vincent Trio performed at MONA FOMA and the Tom Vincent Octet premiered a suite composed by Vincent - Dharani -  for Dark MoFo festival.

Musicians collaborated with
Drummers:  Alf Jackson, Marc Meader, Ben Vanderwal, Danny Fischer, Alan Turnbull, Tony Buck, Manabu Hashimoto
Bass players:  Sam Anning, Matt Clohesy, Brendan Clarke, Leigh Barker, Eugene Romaniuk, Rodrigo Aravena, Cameron Undy, Bart Tarenskeen, Hiroki Hoshino
Singers:  Julie O'Hara, Anita Wardell
Trumpet:  Stephen Grant, Eamon McNelis, Scott Tinkler, Andrew McNaughton
Saxophone:  Julien Wilson, Philip Noy, Paul Williamson, Willow Nelson, Jamie Oehlers, Carlo Barbaro, Branford Marsalis
Trombone:  Ben Gillespie, Shannon Barnett

CDs released:
Blues in America
Tom Vincent Septet
Night Sessions
Just Enough
Jazz Lives!
Blood Red
Second Impressions
Vincent/Meader Trio

References

External links
 Youtube page

Living people
Australian jazz pianists
People from Hobart
1969 births
21st-century pianists